The Latin Grammy Award for Best Rock Album is an honor presented annually by the Latin Academy of Recording Arts & Sciences at the Latin Grammy Awards, a ceremony that recognizes excellence and promotes a wider awareness of cultural diversity and contributions of Latin recording artists in the United States and internationally. According to the category description guide for the 2012 Latin Grammy Awards, the award is for vocal or instrumental rock albums containing at least 51 percent of newly recorded material. It is awarded to solo artists, duos or groups.

The accolade for Best Rock Album was first presented to the Mexican band Café Tacuba at the 1st Latin Grammy Awards in 2000 for their fourth studio album Revés/Yo Soy (1999). From 2001 until 2009, the category was not awarded and was instead split between Best Rock Solo Vocal Album and Best Rock Album by a Duo or Group with Vocal. Best Rock Album was reintroduced in 2010 at the 11th Annual Latin Grammy Awards.

Colombian band Diamante Eléctrico and Mexican group Molotov are the only acts to win this award twice. Uruguayan band NoTeVaGustar are the most nominated artist without a win, with four.

Winners and nominees

2000s

2010s

2020s

Notes 

 Each year is linked to the article about the Latin Grammy Awards held that year
 Showing only the nationality(ies) of the performing artist(s)
 Showing the name of the performer and the nominated album

References 
General

Specific

External links
Official site of the Latin Grammy Awards

 
Rock Album